Simon is an unincorporated community on the Guyandotte River in Wyoming County, West Virginia, United States. Ellery "Elvis" Hatfield, 47, of Simon along with Don Israel Bragg, 33, of Accoville were killed in the 2006 Aracoma Alma Mine disaster at Melville.

The community's "Uncle Si, the relative of an early postmaster.

References 

Unincorporated communities in West Virginia
Unincorporated communities in Wyoming County, West Virginia
Populated places on the Guyandotte River